PG or P.G. may refer to:

Parental Guidance (PG), a content rating in motion picture content rating systems and television content rating systems 
Paying Guest (PG), also called homestay, a type of accommodation

Businesses and organisations
 P.G. Cigars, a cigar brand named after Paul Garmirian
 PG Tips, a British brand of tea
 Bangkok Airways, a Thai regional airline, IATA airline designator PG
 Procter & Gamble (P&G), an American multi-national consumer goods corporation
 Left Party (France) (Parti de gauche), a French democratic socialist political party
 Partido Galeguista (1931), a Galician nationalist political party in Galicia, Spain
 Partido Galeguista (1978), a Galician nationalist political party in Galicia, Spain
Peoples Gazette, a Nigerian online newspaper
 Petrokimia Gresik, an Indonesian fertilizer company
 PlatinumGames, a Japanese video game developer
 Porter-Gaud School, Charleston, South Carolina, U.S.
 PG SLOT In Thailand
 PGSLOT In Thailand
 Jili slot In Thailand

People 
 PG, student in a postgraduate year after high school (secondary school)
 P.G., Brazilian musician and singer who performed with the band Oficina G3
 P.G. Sittenfeld (born 1984), American politician

Places
 Papua New Guinea (ISO 3166-1 country code PG)
 Pauri Garhwal district, a district in the state of Uttarakhand, India
 Podgorica, Montenegro, vehicle licence plate code PG
 Prince George, British Columbia, Canada
 Prince George's County, Maryland, or PG County, U.S.

Science, technology and mathematics
 Polygalacturonase, an enzyme
 Propylene glycol, an organic compound
 Prostaglandin, physiologically active lipid compounds
 PG(n,q), a projective space of Galois geometry
 PG(3,2), the smallest three-dimensional projective space
 pg (Unix), a Unix system command (a terminal pager)
 Paleogene (Pg), a geologic period and system
 Panzergewinde, a technical standard for screw threads
 Petagram (Pg) and Picogram (pg), SI units of mass 
 P.G., Licensed Professional Geologist
 PostgreSQL, a free and open-source relational database management system

Other uses
 Patrologia Graeca, a collection of writings by Christian Church Fathers
 Point guard, one of the five positions in basketball
 Power Grid, a board game
 Project Gutenberg, a volunteer effort to digitize and archive cultural works
 iPhrothiya yeGolide, a South African military decoration
 PG: Psycho Goreman, a 2020 Canadian horror comedy film
 Rated PG, a compilation album by musician Peter Gabriel